The Women’s 1500 metres in short track speed skating at the 2018 Winter Olympics took place on 17 February 2018 at the Gangneung Ice Arena in Gangneung, South Korea.

In the victory ceremony, the medals were presented by Uğur Erdener, member of the International Olympic Committee, accompanied by Jan Dijkema, President of the International Skating Union.

Records
Prior to this competition, the existing world and Olympic records were as follows.

No new records were established during the competition.

Results

Heats
 Q – qualified for the semifinals
 ADV – advanced
 PEN – penalty

Semifinals
 QA – qualified for Final A
 QB – qualified for Final B
 ADV – advanced
 PEN – penalty

Final B

Final A
The final was held at 21:09.

References

Women's short track speed skating at the 2018 Winter Olympics